Fillière is a commune in the department of Haute-Savoie, southeastern France. The municipality was established on 1 January 2017 by merger of the former communes of Thorens-Glières (the seat), Aviernoz, Évires, Les Ollières and Saint-Martin-Bellevue.

Population

See also 
Communes of the Haute-Savoie department

References 

Communes of Haute-Savoie
Populated places established in 2017
2017 establishments in France